Sommerlad's bent-toed gecko (Cyrtodactylus sommerladi) is a species of lizard in the family Gekkonidae. The species is endemic to Laos.

Etymology
The specific name, sommerladi, is in honor of German herpetologist Ralf Sommerlad (1952–2015), who was a Crocodilia specialist.

Geographic range
C. sommerladi is found in central Laos, in Khammouane Province.

Habitat
The preferred natural habitats of C. sommerladi are forest, dry caves, and rocky areas.

Description

Reproduction
C. sommerladi is oviparous.

References

Further reading
Luu VQ, Bonkowski M, Nguyen TQ, Le MD, Schneider N, Ngo HT, Ziegler T (2016). "Evolution in karst massifs: Cryptic diversity among bent-toed geckos along the Truong Son Range with descriptions of three new species and one new country record from Laos". Zootaxa 4107 (2): 101–140. (Cyrtodactylus sommerladi, new species).

Cyrtodactylus
Reptiles described in 2016